"Tu Falta de Querer" is a song by Chilean singer Mon Laferte released in 2015, through Universal Music Group as part of her third studio album Mon Laferte Vol.1. The song was written and produced by Laferte.

Background

At the time of writing this song, Laferte went through depression caused by the rupture of the relationship with her partner, which led her to think about suicide. As she explained in an interview: "I wrote about how I felt and walked there the melody as spinning in my head".

On August 30, 2014, Laferte launched through her official YouTube account the first version of the song, in which we see the singer-songwriter next to her guitar performing the song acoustically in her living room. It was performed with the help of her friends, who recorded this version of the song with the phone, and one of them asked if she could upload it to YouTube, to which Laferte replied: "if no one is going to see it." Soon this video became increasingly popular with respect to the rest of the videos on its channel. It currently has over 15 million views.

On January 31, 2015, she released the album Mon Laferte Vol. 1, which includes the song. On August 21 of that same year, the album was relaunched and remastered, this time through Universal Music, where a new version of "Tu Falta de Querer" was included, which was differentiated by the change of a guitar solo by piano one.

Music video 

The video was released on October 14, 2015, through the Laferte's VEVO channel, becoming a trend and one of the most-watched videos of a Chilean singer. As of January 2020, it reached over 320 million views on the YouTube platform, this being its first VEVO Certified.

The music video juxtaposes funeral and wedding imagery, showing Mon Laferte dressed as a bride, accompanied by a funerary march, on a tour of the Cerro de San Pedro in San Luis Potosí, Mexico, finally being burned in effigy as she sings the final chorus in tears.

Personnel 
Credits adapted from Mon Laferte Vol.1 liner notes.

Vocals

 Mon Laferte – lead vocals

Musicians

 Manuel Soto – piano, synthesizer
Daniel Martinez – drums
David Rodríguez – saxophone
Santiago Lara – guitar
Jimmy Frazier – bass
Patricio Garcia Portius – electric guitar
Néstor Varela – trombone
Joe D'Ettiene – trumpet

Production

Mon Laferte – production
Benjamín Castro – mixing

Charts

Weekly charts

Year-end charts

Certifications

|-

References

2015 songs
2015 singles
Mon Laferte songs
Songs written by Mon Laferte